Hasemi (written: 長谷見) is a Japanese surname. Notable people with the surname include:

 (born 1945), Japanese racing driver
, Japanese manga artist

Japanese-language surnames